Qater Guturan, also rendered as Qater Gutran, may refer to:
 Qater Guturan-e Olya
 Qater Guturan-e Sofla